Den Neie Feierkrop is a satirical weekly newspaper published in Luxembourg.

Footnotes

External links
 Den Neie Feierkrop official website

French-language newspapers published in Luxembourg
German-language newspapers published in Luxembourg
Weekly newspapers published in Luxembourg
Satirical newspapers
1993 establishments in Luxembourg
Publications established in 1993